These are the results of the men's qualification round, the preliminary round which decided the finalists for all eight events for men in artistic gymnastics at the 2000 Summer Olympics in Sydney.  The qualification round took place on September 16 at the Sydney SuperDome.

The top twelve teams from the 1999 World Artistic Gymnastics Championships completed for places in the team final.  Each team was allowed to bring up to six gymnasts.  During qualification, each team could have up to five gymnasts compete on each apparatus, and could count the four highest scores for the team total.  The six teams with the highest scores in the qualification round advanced to the team final.

Individual gymnasts competed for places in the all-around and apparatus finals.  The twenty-four gymnasts with the highest scores in the all-around advanced to that final, except that each country could only send three gymnasts to the all-around final.  The eight gymnasts with the highest scores on each apparatus advanced to those finals, except that each country could only send two gymnasts to each apparatus final.

In total, 97 gymnasts from 32 countries competed in the qualification round.

Results

Finalists

Team all-around

Individual all-around

Floor

Pommel horse

Rings

Vault

Parallel bars

Horizontal bar

References
Official Olympic Report
www.gymnasticsresults.com

Men's artistic qualification
2000
Men's events at the 2000 Summer Olympics